The 1988–89 UEFA Cup was won by Napoli over Stuttgart.

It was the fourth season that English clubs were banned from European competitions. The English league clubs who otherwise would have qualified were Manchester United and Luton Town.

Romania ceded a place to Sweden. German title holders obtained a place for another Albanian retirement.

First round

|}

First leg

Second leg

Stuttgart won 3–2 on aggregate.

Bayern Munich won 10–4 on aggregate.

2–2 on aggregate. Groningen won on away goals.

Lokomotive Leipzig won 7–0 on aggregate.

Heart of Midlothian won 4–0 on aggregate.

Austria Wien won 5–4 on aggregate.

Sporting CP won 6–3 on aggregate.

4–4 on aggregate. Real Sociedad won on away goals.

RFC Liège won 11–1 on aggregate.

Internazionale won 4–2 on aggregate.

Újpesti Dózsa won 2–1 on aggregate.

Rangers won 5–2 on aggregate.

Dynamo Dresden won 2–0 on aggregate.

Bordeaux won 3–2 on aggregate.

Dunajská Streda won 6–2 on aggregate.

1–1 on aggregate. TPS won on away goals.

Waregem won 5–1 on aggregate.

Malmö FF won 3–2 on aggregate.

2–2 on aggregate. First Vienna won on away goals.

Juventus won 5–1 on aggregate.

RŠD Velež won 6–2 on aggregate.

Athletic Bilbao won 2–1 on aggregate.

Benfica won 6–1 on aggregate.

Victoria București won 8–1 on aggregate.

Napoli won 2–1 on aggregate.

Partizan won 10–0 on aggregate.

Servette won 1–0 on aggregate.

Dinamo Minsk won 2–1 on aggregate.

Dinamo Zagreb won 2–1 on aggregate.

Köln won 6–3 on aggregate.

Belenenses won 2–0 on aggregate.

Roma won 4–3 on aggregate.

Second round

|}

First leg

The match was briefly interrupted for an intervention by the fire brigade due to Partizan fans starting a large fire at the stadium's east stand by burning the high jump sponge mat. Furthermore, Roma captain Giuseppe Giannini got hit in the head with a coin thrown from the stands as Partizan fans pelted the pitch with missiles following one of the Roma goals. In addition to the SFr200,000 monetary fine, UEFA punished Partizan with a one-match stadium ban, enforced for their 1989–90 Cup Winners' Cup first round tie versus Celtic.

Second legBayern Munich won 5–1 on aggregate.Köln won 3–1 on aggregate.Stuttgart won 4–2 on aggregate.4–4 on aggregate. Roma won on away goals.0–0 on aggregate. RŠD Velež won 4–3 on penalties.Real Sociedad won 2–1 on aggregate.Heart of Midlothian won 1–0 on aggregate.Napoli won 3–1 on aggregate.Bordeaux won 2–0 on aggregate.Juventus won 7–4 on aggregate.Dynamo Dresden won 5–3 on aggregate.2–2 on aggregate. TPS won on away goals.Internazionale won 2–1 on aggregate.RFC Liège won 3–2 on aggregate.Groningen won 3–1 on aggregate.2–2 on aggregate. Victoria București won on away goals.Third round

|}

First leg

Second leg3–3 on aggregate. Bayern Munich won on away goals.Real Sociedad won 3–2 on aggregate.Stuttgart won 5–1 on aggregate.Heart of Midlothian won 4–2 on aggregate.Napoli won 1–0 on aggregate.Dynamo Dresden won 4–0 on aggregate.Juventus won 2–0 on aggregate.3–3 on aggregate. Victoria București won on away goals.Quarter-finals

|}

First leg

Second leg1–1 on aggregate. Stuttgart won 4–2 on penalties.Bayern Munich won 2–1 on aggregate.Napoli won 3–2 on aggregate.Dynamo Dresden won 5–1 on aggregate.Semi-finals

|}

First leg

Second legNapoli won 4–2 on aggregate.Stuttgart won 2–1 on aggregate.Final

First leg

Second legNapoli won 5–4 on aggregate.''

References

External links
1988–89 All matches UEFA Cup – season at UEFA website
Results at RSSSF.com
 All scorers 1988–89 UEFA Cup according to protocols UEFA
1988/89 UEFA Cup - results and line-ups (archive)

UEFA Cup seasons
2